Hammam ibn Munabbih was an Islamic scholar, from among the Tabi‘in and one of the narrators of hadith.

Biography
He was the son of Munabbih ibn Kamil, and Wahb ibn Munabbih was his brother. His main student was Ma'mar ibn Rashid who transmitted Hammad's material to ʽAbd al-Razzaq al-Sanʽani and Abdullah b. al-Mubarak among others.

There is disagreement among scholars on the date of Hammam's death. Two conflicting clusters of dates exist for Hummam's death in biographical dictionaries. The first cluster being 101 or 102AH/719-720, the second being 131 or 132AH/749-750.

Works
Sahifah Hammam ibn Munabbih was one of the 9 students of Abu Hurairah. Abu Hurairah used to narrate the hadith he heard from the Prophet to his 9 students. Out of all 9 students, only Sahifah Hammam ibn Munabbih's book is quoted by some sources though he hasn't survived. The first quote of the Sahifah Hammam ibn Munabbih's book is in the Musannaf. And currently the whole book is copied into Hadith book Musnad Ahmad ibn Hanbal.

See also
List of Islamic scholars

References

750 deaths
Tabi‘un hadith narrators
Tabi‘un
Year of birth unknown
Yemenite people of Iranian descent